Technemon is a monotypic moth genus of the family Noctuidae. Its only species, Technemon epichares, is found in the Australian state of Queensland. Both the genus and species were first described by Turner in 1945.

References

Acontiinae
Monotypic moth genera